Imre Németh (23 September 1917 in Kassa, Hungary (now Košice, Slovakia) – 18 August 1989 in Budapest) was a Hungarian hammer thrower.

He won the gold medal at the 1948 Summer Olympics in London, Great Britain.
He returned four years later to defend his title at the 1952 Summer Olympics held in Helsinki, Finland but failed, only managing to finish third for the bronze medal.

Németh broke the world record on three occasions. On 14 July 1948 he threw 59.02 metres, beating Erwin Blask's official record from 1938 by two centimetres. (However, this was still inferior to Pat O'Callaghan's unratified record of 59.56, dating back to 1937.) On 4 September 1949 Németh improved the world mark to 59.57, beating both the official and the unofficial record. Finally, on 19 May 1950 Németh threw 59.88 m in Budapest.

Németh's son, javelin thrower Miklós Németh, also won an Olympic gold medal.

References

1917 births
1989 deaths
Sportspeople from Košice
Hungarians in Slovakia
Hungarian male hammer throwers
Olympic gold medalists for Hungary
Olympic bronze medalists for Hungary
Athletes (track and field) at the 1948 Summer Olympics
Athletes (track and field) at the 1952 Summer Olympics
Olympic athletes of Hungary
World record setters in athletics (track and field)
Medalists at the 1952 Summer Olympics
Medalists at the 1948 Summer Olympics
Olympic gold medalists in athletics (track and field)
Olympic bronze medalists in athletics (track and field)